The University of Chittagong is a public research university in Fatehpur Union of Hathazari Upazila,  north of Chittagong. Its  campus is the largest among Bangladeshi universities.

History 

Chittagong University was founded on 3 December 1965 by Fazlul Qadir Chaudhry in Chittagong City.

Facilities

Library

Chittagong University's collection of about 350,000 books, and over 40,000 bound journals is housed in a  library built in 1990.

Chittagong University Museum

Chittagong University Museum was established in 1973 with artifacts from the History Department including fossils found amongst the Nasirabad hills. It has subsequently accumulated an extensive collection of historical artifacts and painting. In 2016, The Daily Star donated a Chittagong history archive to the museum.

University shuttle train

The university shuttle train is operated by Bangladesh Railway eastern division and monitored by university authority. Trains leave Chattogram railway station and Sholoshohor railway station, and city-bound trains leave Chattogram University railway station.

Shuttle graffiti
Chittagong University shuttle train have a long history of graffiti art but there were allegations it was being used by rival political groups to assert influence over train compartments. After April 2011 clashes between five compartment-based gangs left at least eight students injured, the university expelled 11 students and banned all types of compartment-based organisational activities, including sticking posters, leaflets and graffiti on the trains.
Eleven years after that incident, German artist Lukas Zeilinger, accompanied by Livia, his wife, and Arup Barua, a teacher at the Department of Dramatics of the university, painted the carriages once again. The project was self-funded by the Zeiligers as part of their art project.

Campus

Residential halls

, there are 14 residential halls at the university of which 9 (1 under construction) are for male and 5 (1 under construction) for female students.

People

Staff

 Jamal Nazrul Islam, theoretical physicist and mathematician.
 Muhammad Yunus, founder of Grameen Bank and Nobel Prize winner.
 Abdul Mannan, chairman, University Grants Commission of Bangladesh.
 A F M Khalid Hossain, Islamic Scholar

Alumni

Mohammad Muslim Chowdhury, Comptroller and Auditor General of Bangladesh.
Shireen Akhter, academic and vice chancellor.

Mohit Ul Alam, vice chancellor of Jatiya Kabi Kazi Nazrul Islam University.
Tahura Ali, politician and Member of Parliament.
Iftekhar Uddin Chowdhury, academic and vice-chancellor.
A B M Mohiuddin Chowdhury Bangladeshi politician and former Mayor of Chittagong.
Mahmudul Islam Chowdhury, Former Mayor of Chittagong and Member of Parliament.

Rezaul Karim Chowdhury, politician and Mayor of Chittagong.
Annisul Huq, entrepreneur, television show host and first Mayor of North Dhaka.
Fazle Kabir, bureaucrat, economist and central banker.
Kazi Sharif Kaikobad, major general in the Bangladesh Army.
Hafiz Rashid Khan, postcolonialist poet, author, journalist and Adibaasi researcher.
Hasan Mahmud, Member of Parliament and Minister of Information.
Rashed Rouf, novelist, editor and journalist.
Surendra Kumar Sinha, lawyer who served as the 21st Chief Justice of Bangladesh.
AFM Solaiman Chowdhury, civil servant and chairman of the National Board of Revenue.
Wadud Bhuiyan, is a Bangladeshi politician and former Member of Parliament.

See also
 List of universities in Bangladesh

References

External links

 Official website

 
Educational institutions established in 1966
Public universities of Bangladesh
Forestry education
1966 establishments in East Pakistan